The Kapuskasing River is a river in the James Bay drainage basin in Cochrane District and Algoma District in northeastern Ontario, Canada. The river is a left tributary of the Mattagami River.

Course
The river begins at Kapuskasing Lake in geographic Kapuskasing Township, Algoma District, near the railway point of Elsas, on the Canadian National Railway transcontinental main line and the location of Elsas railway station served by Via Rail Canadian trains. It flows northeast under the mainline, takes in the right tributary Nemegosenda River, passes over the Jackpine Rapids (bypassed by the Jackpine Portage), the Loon Rapids, the Buchan Falls and the Clouston Rapids, and takes in the right tributary Dunrankin River. It heads north over the Cedar Rapids, heads over the Woman Falls and Old Woman Falls, and passes from geographic Shanly Township, Algoma District into geographic Cargill Township in Cochrane District.

The Kapuskasing River continues northeast over the White Otter Falls, the Bakatase Falls, the Camp Three Rapids and the Big Beaver Falls, takes in the right tributary Saganash River and reaches the town of Kapuskasing, where it is crossed by Ontario Highway 11 and the Ontario Northland Railway line (formerly Canadian National Railway, originally the National Transcontinental Railway). The Mattagami River flows via the Moose River to James Bay.

Tributaries

Tucker Creek (right)
Torrance Creek (right)
Hopkins Creek (left)
Remi River (right)
Lily Creek (right)
Lost River (left)
O'Brien Creek (right)
Teetzel Creek (left)
Gough Creek (right)
Saganash River (right)
Big Beaver Creek (left)
Alder Creek (right)
Pinette Creek (right)
Shanly Creek (right)
Graveyard Creek (left)
Moss Creek (left)
Oscar Creek (left)
Allenby Creek (right)
Wigwam Creek (left)
MacIntosh Creek (right)
Dunrankin River (left)
Nemegosenda River (right)
Kapuskasing Lake
Chapleau River

Recreation
The Kapuskasing River Walleye Tournament, part of the Northern Ontario Walleye Trail (NOWT), is held annually on the river on a  stretch of the river from its mouth upstream.  More than 20,000 pounds of wild rice was restored in the Kapuskasing River.

Economy
Hydroelectric generating stations with a combined capacity of 22 MW were proposed at four sites south of the town of Kapuskasing: Big Beaver Falls, Camp Three Rapids, White Otter Falls and Old Woman Falls. The sites were expected to be in operation by 2012, but FIT Contracts were terminated in 2015.

In addition, hydroelectric generating stations with a combined capacity of 19.45 MW were proposed for four sites on the river between its source and to the south of the town of Kapuskasing.

Update:  Actions taken by the Ontario Rivers Alliance and its members led to the termination of 19 Feed-in-Tariff (FIT) Contracts.  Four sets of rapids on the Kapuskasing River were protected from development.  10 Ontario rivers were protected in all:  Matawin, Vermilion, Petawawa, Wanapitei, Blanche, Ivanhoe, Frederick House, Kapuskasing, Larder, and Serpent Rivers.

See also
List of rivers of Ontario

References

Other map sources:

External links 

Rivers of Cochrane District
Rivers of Algoma District